Anna-Brita Stenström (born 1932) is a linguist whose areas of research include corpus linguistics, sociolinguistics, pragmatics, and discourse analysis. She has initiated and co-directed three online corpora of adolescent language: The Bergen Corpus of London Teenage Language (COLT), Ungdomsspråk och språkkontakt i Norden (UNO), and Corpus Oral de Lenguaje Adolescente (COLA). She is Professor Emerita of English Linguistics at the University of Bergen, Norway.

Stenström is a foreign member of the Norwegian Academy of Science and Letters.

Publications 
Anna-Brita Stenström and Annette Myre Jørgensen, eds. 2009. Youngspeak in a Multilingual Perspective (Pragmatics & Beyond New Series) John Benjamins.
Stenström, Anna-Brita 2009. “Pragmatic markers in contrast: Spanish pues nada and English anyway”. In Youngspeak in a Multilingual Perspective, Stenström, Anna-Brita and Annette Myre Jørgensen (eds.), 137–159.
Stenström, Anna-Brita. 2006. “Taboo words in teenage talk”. In Language Variation and Change: Historical and contemporary perspectives. Special issue of Spanish in Context 3:1 (2006), Mar-Molinero, Clare and Miranda Stewart (eds.), 115–138.
Karin Aijmer and Anna-Brita Stenström, eds. 2004. Discourse Patterns in Spoken and Written Corpora (Pragmatics & Beyond New Series) John Benjamins.
Stenström, Anna-Brita. 2003. “It’s not that I really care about him personally you know”. In Discourse Constructions of Youth Identities, Androutsopoulos, Jannis K. and Alexandra Georgakopoulou (eds.)
Anna-Brita Stenström, Gisle Andersen and Ingrid Kristine Hasund. 2002. Trends in Teenage Talk: Corpus compilation, analysis and findings [Studies in Corpus Linguistics) John Benjamins.
Stenström, Anna-Brita 1998. “From Sentence to Discourse”. In Discourse Markers: Descriptions and theory, Jucker, Andreas H. and Yael Ziv (eds.)

References

1932 births
Living people
Linguists from Sweden
Corpus linguists
Women linguists
Academic staff of the University of Bergen
Members of the Norwegian Academy of Science and Letters